Marcelo Santos Oliveira or simply Marcelinho  (born March 9, 1981 in Aracaju), is a Brazilian attacking midfielder.

Contract
Botafogo (Loan) 2 January 2008 to 31 December 2008
Villa Rio-RJ 1 January 2008 to 31 December 2011

References

External links
 sambafoot
 CBF
 globoesporte

1981 births
Living people
Brazilian footballers
People from Aracaju
Associação Desportiva Confiança players
CR Vasco da Gama players
Botafogo de Futebol e Regatas players
Joinville Esporte Clube players
Rio Branco Esporte Clube players
Associação Chapecoense de Futebol players
Association football midfielders
Sportspeople from Sergipe